The 2011 Texas wildfires were a series of destructive wildfires in Texas that occurred in the 2011 fire season. During 2011 in Texas, around 31,453 fires had burned  (about double the previous record), 2,947 homes (1,939 of which were destroyed over the Labor Day weekend), and over 2,700 other structures. 47.3% of all acreage burned in the United States in 2011 was burned in Texas. The fires had been particularly severe due to the 2011 Southern US drought that covered the state, and was exacerbated by the unusual convergence of strong winds, unseasonably warm temperatures, and low humidity.

Timber lost to drought and wildfire in 2011 could have produced $1.6 billion worth of products, resulting in a $3.4 billion economic impact in East Texas.

Firefighters from more than forty-three states were involved in combating the fires. Two firefighters were killed. Eastland volunteer firefighter Gregory M. Simmons, 51, died April 15 while battling a  blaze Friday afternoon near Eastland. Cactus volunteer firefighter Elias Jaquez died April 20 from injuries sustained while fighting a blaze April 9 in Moore County.

On Sunday, September 4, 2011, a forest fire known as the Bastrop County Complex Fire engulfed rural areas to the east Bastrop, Texas, including the Tahitian Village development, and by September 30 had destroyed 1,645 homes, burned 34,068 acres, and killed two people. This fire is now regarded as the most catastrophic wildfire in Texas history.

Texas Governor Rick Perry declared a State of Disaster starting on December 21, 2010, and renewed the proclamation every month. On April 16, 2011, Perry asked that President Barack Obama declare 252 of 254 Texas counties as disaster areas due to wildfires and wildfire danger; the request was partially approved on July 1, 2011.  Critics of the governor's relief efforts point to his budget cuts to the Texas Forest Service which provides a first line of defense against wildfires. Overall, wildfires in Texas during 2011 caused $510.927 million in damages and caused six fatalities, though an additional 62 people were injured.

Background
The 2010 Texas wildfire season began on November 15. A La Niña weather pattern that began in the summer of 2010 brought widespread drought to Texas. The percentage of exceptional drought in the state was the highest since the United States Drought Monitor began tracking the data in 2000. A pattern of troughs from the Pacific Northwest brought strong winds over the plains. These weather conditions coupled with an above normal grass fuel loading created conditions for an active fire season.

Notable fires
This is a list of known Texas wildfires occurring in 2011 that reached a size greater than 10,000 acres (40 km2) and/or caused significant destruction in residential areas.

Bastrop County Complex

Due to the ongoing exceptional drought conditions in most of Texas and the high winds brought to the state by Tropical Storm Lee, a series of wildfires flared up over Labor Day weekend and continued into the following week. The largest and most destructive was what is now known as the Bastrop County Complex. At approximately 3:00 p.m. (CDT) on  September 4, two fires started north of Bastrop State Park in the communities of Circle D-KC Estates and Taihitan Village. The likely cause of the blaze was sparks from electric power lines. 30 mph gusts of wind apparently toppled trees which tumbled into electrical lines at two locations, creating sparks that fell onto and ignited the dry grass and leaf litter below. The fire was exacerbated by the outflow of Tropical Storm Lee in conjunction with exceptional drought. The fire quickly spread, engulfing 400 homes. Multiple areas and locales were evacuated, including the Bastrop Animal Shelter, Bastrop State Park (more than half of which was burned), and other communities affected by the fire. By 7:30 PM on September 5, 2011, the fire had burned about 25,000 acres and 500 homes. Winds began to calm the evening of September 5, but the fire still had no containment by the evening of September 6. By September 11, 1,554 homes had been destroyed. By October 1, the fire had reached 98% containment but had burned a total of 34,068 acres and 1,645 homes, making it the most destructive fire in Texas history. At 8:00 PM on October 10, the fire was declared 100% contained.

Bear Creek Fire
On September 4, the largest fire in East Texas History began. Scorching more than 43,000 acres in Cass and Marion Counties. The fire took over 5 days to get under control involving numerous houses, and property. Multiple fire departments aided in the suppression efforts. A total of 91 structures were burned by the wildfire, amassing a damage toll of $6 million.

Colorado County Fire
The fire consumed 1800 acres, 11 homes, 40 outbuildings, and about 38 vehicles. The fire was contained a few days later.

Cooper Mountain Ranch Fire
Following a period of gusty conditions in mid-April, thunderstorms occurring between April 10–11 over West Texas initiated several wildfires. The fire ultimately spread to Fisher, Scurry, and Stonewall counties. On April 14, the city of Rotan was evacuated as the fire spread east, with one home destroyed near the county line between Kent and Stonewall counties; residents of Rotan returned to their homes after a few hours. A change in the winds to northerly caused the fire to spread south towards Camp Springs on April 18.

The fire was eventually contained on April 22 after burning  of grassland, resulting in $1.26 million in economic losses and the destruction of 350 utility poles. It was the sixth largest wildfire in Texas history. FEMA approved $1.35 million in assistance grants as a result of the fire.

Crockett Fires

Fires burned between Texas 7 and US 287 and County Road 4505 but later jumped across to CR 4529.  The cause of this fire is unknown.
Another fire originally started in Anderson County but moved into Houston County near the Percilla Community.  This fire was apparently caused by a downed power line.

Deaton Cole Fire
The fire started on April 25 and the cause is unknown. The fire was controlled on May 10.

Delhi Fire
On September 4, a fire began near Jeddo, Texas in Caldwell County. The next day, 6 homes were burned, including .

Dickens Complex
The Dickens Complex of fires in Dickens County consisted of the Edwards, Batch Camp, South Camp, and Afton fires. The fires were started by lightning strikes on May 7. The fires were contained on May 15 after burning .

Encino Fire

The Encino Fire was located  South of San Angelo. It started from a lightning strike during a thunderstorm. The fire consumed over  but destroyed no buildings.

Moore Fire (Gladewater)
This fire, which was described by a longtime sheriff as "the fastest moving fire he had ever seen", burned 1,400 acres, destroying six houses and many barns. Outbuildings and pieces of equipment were also lost. More tragically, 2 fatalities occurred in a mobile home, when a mother and her 18-month-old daughter were unable to escape the fast moving blaze. A house mate was injured but was able to escape the blaze. The fires moved so quickly due to the extremely dry conditions and the high winds, sometimes reaching 40 mph. The fire was later extinguished despite state firefighting resources being stretched to their limits.

Griffith League Scout Ranch Fire
This fire started around 2 pm on October 4, 2011, at Oak Hill Cemetery Road, east of FM 2336, near the Griffith League Scout Ranch.  It grew to 100 acres within two hours, 1,000 acres by nightfall.  The outbreak was 25% contained by 8:30pm following the efforts of seven bulldozers and over 30 fire trucks with assistance from four aircraft that dumped 90,000 gallons of fire retardant onto the blaze. As of the morning of October 5, 50 homes had been evacuated.

The 5,000-acre ranch had already lost approximately 1,000 acres to fire on September 4 and 5. 350 acres had burned previously in a wildfire on August 21, 2010.

Horseshoe Fire
On August 15, 2011, a wildfire broke out in central Leander, Texas. 189 homes in the surrounding area were immediately evacuated. The fire burned 30 acres in total and raced through a mobile-home neighborhood, destroying 15 homes and multiple vehicles. Since it broke out on Horseshoe Drive, it is known as the Horseshoe Fire. This was the first of two destructive fires Leander experienced within three weeks, the second being the Moonglow Fire.

Iron Mountain Fire
The cause of the Iron Mountain Fire is unknown.

Moonglow Fire
On September 5, a wildfire broke out in the Mason Creek North subdivision (on Moonglow Drive) in Leander. Police declared the cause to be arson. The fire destroyed 11 homes and damaged nine. The Moonglow fire was the second destructive wildfire Leander had experienced within three weeks, leading the Leander City Council to declare the city a disaster area shortly thereafter.

Pedernales Bend Fire
The Pedernales Bend Fire (also known as the Spicewood fire and Pedernales Fire One) was a fire that began on September 4 near Lake Travis. Fanned by strong winds, the fire quickly grew, forcing residents in a  radius of the fire to evacuate the area. By the end of the day, the fire was estimated to have engulfed . The next day, the fire already destroyed 20 homes and moved across the Pedernales River, continuing to burn in Hays County. The fire also cut power from 545 homes. However, the growing fire slowed down as it was quickly contained, and on September 7, the fire was completely contained. In total, 65 structures were destroyed, including 34 homes. The fire burned  in total.

Possum Kingdom Complex
The complex consists of the Possum Kingdom West Fire (90,000 acres), Possum Kingdom East Fire , Hohertz Fire  and Jackson Ranch Fire . The fire destroyed 166 homes and two churches. 600 more homes were threatened. Possum Kingdom State Park was closed on April 15. Ninety percent of the park was involved in the fire. 450 firefighters, three helitankers and three helicopters fought the fire along a  fire line.

On August 30, 2011, another outbreak of wildfires ravaged the Possum Kingdom Lake area, continuing well into September and destroying 39 homes by the time of containment.

Riley Road Fire
The Riley Road Fire started on September 5 in Grimes County and quickly spread South with the aid of high winds crossing over into Waller County. Within three days, the fire had scorched at least 12,500 acres and destroyed over 100 homes in Grimes, Montgomery and Waller counties. By September 10, the fire had been 100% contained and burned out with no further damage.

Rock House Fire
The Rock House Fire began on April 9 west of Marfa. An electrical short in an abandoned building is believed to have started the fire. The fire destroyed 24 homes and two businesses, and killed herds of cattle and 4 horses. On April 10, Davis Mountains State Park was closed indefinitely due to the proximity of the fire. The park was used as a staging and camping area for firefighters for the duration of the fire. Texas State Highway 118 was also closed at several times during the fire.

Scenic Brook Fire
On the morning of April 17, Michael Weathers, a homeless man, started a campfire to cook his breakfast. He later left the campfire unattended, and the hot coals started a fire that spread into the Scenic Brook, Austin, Texas neighborhood in Austin. Two C-130 airplanes dispersed fire retardant chemicals. Police and EMS helicopters equipped with buckets dropped water on the blaze. Weathers was arrested and charged with arson.

Schwartz Fire
The Schwartz Fire started May 7 and the cause is still under investigation. Two structures were directly threatened by the fire and another sixteen indirectly, but none structures were lost.

Swenson Fire
Sparks from a cutting torch started the Swenson Fire on April 6 near Aspermont and burned  in King, Knox, and Stonewall counties but caused minimal structure damage. Two unoccupied houses were lost.

White Hat Fire
Bulldozers, fire engines, and heavy tankers were sent to handle the fire. Soon, residents east of the community of Maryneal would be evacuated. On June 22, progress was made and the fire was 50% contained. Due to lower winds the next day, the fire decreased and became 70% contained, but it had already burned  of land and charred 35 homes. The fire continued to decrease in size over the next days. On June 27, the fire was declared fully contained after burning .

Wildcat Fire

The Wildcat Fire started on April 11 at approximately 0030 from a lightning strike in southern Coke County west of Robert Lee. The fire was held within a 30-acre area until approximately 1630 on April 14.  A wind shift coupled with increased wind speeds and rough terrain, enabled the fire to breach established fire lines.  Forty mph winds pushed the fire east, reaching TX Hwy 208, before shifting to the south.  The flame front was estimated to move at 400 ft per minute.  Winds later shifted and pushed fire south. Local officials alerted residents of Grape Creek and Quail Valley, small communities north of San Angelo, to prepare for evacuation. By April 16, the winds again shifted and moved the fire north towards Robert Lee, forcing evacuations of the Edith community, and houses along both FM 2034 and Hwy 208 Texas State Highway 208. On April 17, Bronte was under a recommended evacuation, but the evacuation notice expired the same day. By April 18, the fire burned an estimated , with a 10% containment, then the same day a confirmed 30% containment was stated. On April 21, the fire was at 75% containment, after burning .  Despite several structures being lost, mostly limited to outbuildings, isolated barns, and hunters' camps, the fire claimed only one unoccupied home.

Wildfire summary

Volunteers respond
Nearly 35,000 Texans are members of the state's 1,497 fully volunteer fire departments (VFDs) and 292 combined volunteer and paid departments. Those combination departments have about 6,200 paid firefighters, while the state's 139 fully paid departments have more than 19,500 firefighters primarily focused on protecting the state's municipalities, according to Texas Forest Service records. While some state and federal grant funding is available for fire departments, most fire protection is funded at a local level through taxation or donations.

See also

Days of Prayer for Rain in the State of Texas

References

External links
United States Drought Monitor
Texas Wildfire Review: Did Bureaucracy Prevent a Timely Response?:  Field Hearing before the Subcommittee on Oversight, Investigations, and Management of the Committee on Homeland Security, House of Representatives, One Hundred Twelfth Congress, First Session, October 17, 2011

Lists of wildfires in the United States
Wildfires in Texas
Arson in Texas
2011 Texas wildfires